The Eagle Academy for Young Men is an American all-boys' public secondary school in the Bronx borough of New York City, New York.
A part of the New York City Department of Education, it opened in 2004, established by the 100 Black Men of America organization.

The school, intended to serve Latino/Hispanic and black boys, is a part of the Eagle Academy network of schools, which has campuses in other New York City boroughs and Newark, New Jersey.

Student body
As of 2014, 62% of the students were black and 35% were Hispanic/Latino. 80% of the students were on free or reduced lunch.

References

External links

 , the school's official website
 , the school's NYC Department of Education portal

2004 establishments in New York City
Public boys' schools in the United States
Educational institutions established in 2004
Public middle schools in the Bronx
Boys' schools in New York City